Kim Ji-hyon (born 11 January 1995) is a South Korean freestyle skier. He competed in the 2018 Winter Olympics.

References

1995 births
Living people
Freestyle skiers at the 2018 Winter Olympics
South Korean male freestyle skiers
Olympic freestyle skiers of South Korea
Freestyle skiers at the 2017 Asian Winter Games